2015 Women's Volleyball Thai-Denmark Super League was the third edition of the tournament. It was held at the MCC Hall of The Mall Ngamwongwan in Nonthaburi, Thailand from 26 – 30 March 2015.

Teams
 Bangkok Glass
 Ayutthaya A.T.C.C.
 Idea Khonkaen
 Nakhonnont 3BB
 Nakhon Ratchasima
 Supreme Chonburi E-Tech

Pools composition

Preliminary round

Pool A

|}

|}

Pool B

|}

|}

Final round

Semifinals

|}

Final

|}

Final standing

See also 
 2015 Men's Volleyball Thai-Denmark Super League

References
 Schedule Female Team

Thai-Denmark Super League
Volleyball,Thai-Denmark Super League
Women's,2015